Martin T. Lapointe (born  September 12, 1973) is a Canadian former professional ice hockey player. He played in the National Hockey League (NHL) for the Detroit Red Wings, Boston Bruins, Chicago Blackhawks, and Ottawa Senators.

He is best known for winning the Stanley Cup as a member of the Red Wings in both 1997 and 1998. He is currently the director of player development for the Montreal Canadiens.

Playing career
Lapointe was selected 10th overall by the Detroit Red Wings in the 1991 NHL Entry Draft. He has played in 991 career NHL games as of the 2007–08 NHL season, scoring 181 goals and 200 assists for 381 points. He also compiled 1,143 career penalty minutes. He won two Stanley Cup championships as a member of the Red Wings, in 1997 and 1998.

In the summer of 2001, he signed a 4-year free agent contract with the Boston Bruins. Boston was widely criticized for the deal, and Lapointe became known as perhaps the league's most overpaid player. After the NHL lockout wiped out the entire 2004–05 season, he signed a 3-year free agent deal with Chicago in August 2005. He later served as Blackhawks' captain for the latter portion of the 2005–06 season due to an injury to Adrian Aucoin.

Lapointe had played in 209 consecutive games with Chicago and 254 straight overall before he sat out Jan. 16 against St. Louis with what was believed to be the flu. Prior to that, his last absence had been Dec. 29, 2003, with Boston.

On February 26, 2008, Lapointe was traded by the Chicago Blackhawks to the Ottawa Senators for a sixth round draft pick. After the season, Lapointe was not re-signed by the Senators and became an unrestricted free agent.

Front Office Career
On December 5, 2009, the Blackhawks hired Lapointe as a pro scout.

On June 13, 2012, the newly appointed Montreal Canadiens General Manager Marc Bergevin named Lapointe Director of Player Development for the Canadiens.

Personal life
A hockey rink in Lachine, Quebec, is named in Lapointe's honor. He and his wife have three sons and a daughter. His oldest son Guyot played for the D3 ACHA team at the University of Michigan, graduating in 2019. His son, Philippe, currently plays ice hockey for the Michigan Wolverines men's ice hockey team.

Lapointe currently resides with his family in Hinsdale, Illinois.

Career statistics

Regular season and playoffs

International

See also
Captain (ice hockey)

References

External links

1973 births
Living people
Adirondack Red Wings players
Boston Bruins players
Canadian ice hockey right wingers
Chicago Blackhawks captains
Chicago Blackhawks players
Chicago Blackhawks scouts
Detroit Red Wings draft picks
Detroit Red Wings players
Ice hockey people from Montreal
Laval Titan players
Montreal Canadiens coaches
National Hockey League first-round draft picks
Ottawa Senators players
People from Lachine, Quebec
Stanley Cup champions
Canadian ice hockey coaches
Collège de Montréal alumni